List of ragtime pianists
Elliott Shapiro (1895–1956), son of music publisher Maurice Shapiro, in a 1951 article, offered a list of standout ragtime pianists — in two categories:

 Ragtime pioneers

 Mike Bernard (1875–1936)
 George Botsford (1874–1949)
 Louis Chauvin (1881–1908)
 Ben Harney (1872–1938)
 Tony Jackson (1882–1921)
 Scott Joplin (1868–1917)
 Jelly Roll Morton (1890–1941)
 Tom Turpin (1871–1932)
 Percy Wenrich (1887–1952)

Later ragtimers

 Eubie Blake (1887–1983)
 Ed. B. Claypoole (fr) (1883–1952)
 Les C. Copeland (1887–1942)
 Ford Dabney (1883–1958)
 Lucien Denni (1886–1947)
 Jay Roberts (fr) (1890–1932)
 Luckey Roberts (1887–1968)
 J. Russel Robinson (1892–1963)
 Willie "The Lion" Smith (1893–1973)
 Fats Waller (1904–1943)
 Pete Wendling (1888–1974)
 James Edison 'Slap' White (1881– c. 1930s)

Many ragtime pianist, beginning around the 1920s, went on to perform stride and boogie-woogie and other lists of artists might be more identified with either. Shapiro's two lists above, exclude those who are known more as (i) non-piano ragtime composers (ii) ragtime revivalist (iii) stride pianists, and (iv) boogie-woogie pianists. Early standout ragtime pianists not on Shapiro's lists include: 

 Early ragtimers not on Shapiro's list

 Frank P. Banta (1870–1903)
 Euday L. Bowman (1887–1949)
 Brun Campbell (1884–1952)
 Hughie Cannon (1877–1912)
 Glover Compton (1884–1964)
 William Ezell (1892–1963)
 Blind Leroy Garnett (1897–1933)
 Wallie Herzer (1885–1961)
 Fred Hylands (1872–1913)
 Jean-Baptiste Lafrenière (1874–1912)
 Lewis F. Muir (1883–1915)
 James Scott (1885–1938)
 William Turk (1866–1911)
 Bee Walker (1898–1997)
 Arnold Wiley (1898–1964)

See also 
 List of ragtime musicians

References 

Ragtime pianists